Moses Ketso “Toto” Makume is a South African politician who has been a Member of the Free State Executive Council for  Cooperative Governance and Traditional Affairs and Human Settlements and a Member of the Free State Provincial Legislature since March 2023. He was elected as the Deputy Provincial Chairperson of the African National Congress in January 2023.

Political career
In May 2021, Makume was named to the Interim Provincial Committee (IPC) of the African National Congress after the Supreme Court of Appeal ruled that the party's 2018 provincial elective conference was unlawful and nullified the provincial leadership elected at the conference.

At the ANC's provincial elective conference held from 21 to 22 January 2023, Makume was nominated from the conference floor for the position of Deputy Provincial Chairperson; he defeated former Mangaung mayor Thabo Manyoni, winning the position with 346 votes while Manyoni received only 307 votes.

Free State provincial government
Makume was sworn in as a Member of the Free State Provincial Legislature on 13 March 2023. The following day, he was appointed to the Executive Council of the Free State as the Member of the Executive Council for Cooperative Governance and Traditional Affairs and Human Settlements by premier Mxolisi Dukwana, who he succeeded as MEC for the portfolio.

References

Living people
Year of birth missing (living people)
Sotho people
African National Congress politicians
Members of the Free State Provincial Legislature